Nicolás Federico Castro (born 1 November 2000) is an Argentine professional footballer who plays as a midfielder for Belgian club Genk.

Professional career
A youth product of 9 de Julio, Castro joined the academy of Newell's Old Boys in 2016. On 3 January 2019 ,Castro signed his first professional contract with Newell's Old Boys. Castro made his professional debut with Newell's Old Boys in a 1-0 Argentine Primera División loss to Argentinos Juniors on 25 November 2019.

On 18 July 2022 he signed a five-year contract with Genk.

References

External links
 

2000 births
Sportspeople from Santa Fe Province
Living people
People from Rafaela
Argentine footballers
Argentina youth international footballers
Association football midfielders
Newell's Old Boys footballers
K.R.C. Genk players
Argentine Primera División players
Belgian Pro League players
Argentine expatriate footballers
Expatriate footballers in Belgium
Argentine expatriate sportspeople in Belgium